Sift refers to the straining action of a sifter or sieve.

Sift or SIFT may also refer to:

 Scale-invariant feature transform, an algorithm in computer vision to detect and describe local features in images
 Selected-ion flow tube, a technique used for mass spectrometry
 Shanghai Institute of Foreign Trade, a public university in Shanghai, China
 Summary of Information on Film and Television, a database of the British Film Institute National Library
 Summer Institute for Future Teachers, a residential summer program at Eastern Connecticut State University
 SIFT (software), a digital forensics appliance

See also
 Sieve (disambiguation), for the word "sift"
 Sifted (formerly VeriShip), an American logistics company